The 2003 NCAA Division I softball season, play of college softball in the United States organized by the National Collegiate Athletic Association (NCAA) at the Division I level, began in January 2003.  The season progressed through the regular season, many conference tournaments and championship series, and concluded with the 2003 NCAA Division I softball tournament and 2003 Women's College World Series. The Women's College World Series, consisting of the eight remaining teams in the NCAA Tournament and held in Oklahoma City at ASA Hall of Fame Stadium, ended on May 26, 2003.

Conference standings

Women's College World Series
The 2003 NCAA Women's College World Series took place from May 22 to May 26, 2003 in Oklahoma City.

Season leaders
Batting
Batting average: .490 – Amber Jackson, Bethune–Cookman Wildcats
RBIs: 79 – Lovieanne Jung, Arizona Wildcats
Home runs: 25 – Lovieanne Jung, Arizona Wildcats & Kristen Rivera, Washington Huskies

Pitching
Wins: 40-5 & 40-7 – Alicia Hollowell, Arizona Wildcats & Keira Goerl, UCLA Bruins
ERA: 0.37 (13 ER/242.2 IP) – Cat Osterman, Texas Longhorns
Strikeouts: 488 – Cat Osterman, Texas Longhorns

Records
Sophomore class single game RBIs:
11 – Stephanie Best, UCF Knights & Jackie Coburn, Arizona Wildcats; March 19 & May 10, 2003

Sophomore class strikeout ratio:
14.1 (488 SO/242.2 IP) – Cat Osterman, Texas Longhorns

Senior class walks:
107 – Veronica Nelson, California Golden Bears

Awards
USA Softball Collegiate Player of the Year:
Cat Osterman, Texas Longhorns

Honda Sports Award Collegiate Woman Athlete of The Year:
Natasha Watley, UCLA Bruins

Honda Sports Award Softball:
Natasha Watley, UCLA Bruins

All America Teams
The following players were members of the All-American Teams.

First Team

Second Team

Third Team

References

External links